Breaux Bridge High School (BBHS or BBSH) is a senior high school in Breaux Bridge, Louisiana. It is a part of the St. Martin Parish School Board.

Athletics
Breaux Bridge High athletics competes in the LHSAA.

Championships
Football championships
(1) State Championship: 2005

External links
 Breaux Bridge High School

Schools in St. Martin Parish, Louisiana
Public high schools in Louisiana